Reggina Calcio just renewed its Serie A contract, thanks to a late surge in the league competition and a successful spareggio against Atalanta. Reggina drew 0-0 at home, and then turned around a deficit to win 2-1 away from home, with Francesco Cozza and Emiliano Bonazzoli being the match-winners. The player who got the most headlines during the season was  Japanese playmaker Shunsuke Nakamura, who scored seven goals and created several others. He also helped Reggina to get onto the Asian market, so the signing was largely hailed as a genial manoeuvre by president Pasquale Foti.

Squad

Goalkeepers
  Luca Castellazzi
  Emanuele Belardi
  Martin Lejsal

Defenders
  Martin Jiránek
  Gianluca Falsini
  Bruno Cirillo
  Giovanni Morabito
  Ivan Franceschini
  Stefano Torrisi
  Aimo Diana
  Roberto Cardinale
  Alessandro Pierini

Midfielders
  Carlos Paredes
  Shunsuke Nakamura
  Julio León
  José Mamede
  Giandomenico Mesto
  Mozart
  Francesco Cozza
  Ricardo Verón

Attackers
  Emiliano Bonazzoli
  Gianluca Savoldi
  David Di Michele
  Massimo Rastelli
  Erjon Bogdani

Serie A

Matches

 Perugia-Reggina 2-0
 1-0 Fabrizio Miccoli (51)
 2-0 Giovanni Tedesco (80)
 Reggina-Inter 1-2
 0-1 Christian Vieri (7)
 1-1 Shunsuke Nakamura (90 + 2 pen)
 1-2 Álvaro Recoba (90 + 3)
 Como-Reggina 1-1
 1-0 Benito Carbone (17)
 1-1 Shunsuke Nakamura (63)
 Reggina-Brescia 2-2
 0-1 Stephen Appiah (10)
 1-1 Alessandro Pierini (44)
 1-2 Roberto Baggio (45 + 2 pen)
 2-2 Shunsuke Nakamura (82)
 Udinese-Reggina 1-0
 1-0 David Pizarro (51 pen)
 Reggina-Torino 2-1
 0-1 Alessandro Conticchio (47)
 1-1 Erjon Bogdani (54)
 2-1 Carlos Paredes (80)
 Milan-Reggina 2-0
 1-0 Filippo Inzaghi (20)
 2-0 Rivaldo (64)
 Reggina-Lazio 0-3
 0-1 Stefano Fiore (16)
 0-2 Dejan Stanković (33)
 0-3 Bernardo Corradi (53)
 Reggina-Modena 0-1
 0-1 Rubens Pasino (80)
 Empoli-Reggina 4-2
 1-0 Antonio Di Natale (3)
 1-1 Shunsuke Nakamura (39)
 2-1 Antonio Di Natale (40)
 3-1 Tommaso Rocchi (53 pen)
 3-2 Jorge Vargas (81)
 4-2 Antonio Di Natale (90 + 2)
 Reggina-Atalanta 1-1
 0-1 Carmine Gautieri (34)
 1-1 Gianluca Savoldi (56)
 Reggina-Chievo 1-1
 1-0 Shunsuke Nakamura (23 pen)
 1-1 Nicola Legrottaglie (49)
 Parma-Reggina 2-0
 1-0 Adriano (57)
 2-0 Adriano (79)
 Roma-Reggina 3-0
 1-0 Walter Samuel (3)
 2-0 Francesco Totti (24)
 3-0 Vincenzo Montella (70)
 Reggina-Piacenza 3-1
 0-1 Nicola Boselli (13)
 1-1 Gianluca Savoldi (49)
 2-1 Gianluca Savoldi (64)
 3-1 David Di Michele (77 pen)
 Juventus-Reggina 5-0
 1-0 Antonio Conte (22)
 2-0 David Trezeguet (34)
 3-0 Francesco Cozza (65 og)
 4-0 Alessandro Del Piero (72)
 5-0 Marco Di Vaio (84)
 Reggina-Bologna 1-0
 1-0 Gianluca Savoldi (15)
 Lazio-Reggina 0-1
 0-1 Emiliano Bonazzoli (46)
 Reggina-Perugia 3-1
 1-0 David Di Michele (1)
 1-1 Rahman Rezaei (2)
 2-1 Francesco Cozza (27)
 3-1 Emiliano Bonazzoli (47)
 Inter-Reggina 3-0
 1-0 Christian Vieri (10)
 2-0 Mohamed Kallon (39)
 3-0 Mohamed Kallon (42 pen)
 Reggina-Como 4-1
 0-1 Nicola Caccia (13)
 1-1 Francesco Cozza (33)
 2-1 Francesco Cozza (38)
 3-1 Aimo Diana (79)
 4-1 Mozart (88)
 Brescia-Reggina 2-1
 1-0 Roberto Baggio (60)
 2-0 Fabio Petruzzi (67)
 2-1 David Di Michele (69)
 Reggina-Udinese 3-2
 1-0 Emiliano Bonazzoli (3)
 1-1 David Pizarro (8 pen)
 2-1 David Di Michele (12)
 2-2 Vincenzo Iaquinta (45)
 3-2 Francesco Cozza (65)
 Torino-Reggina 1-0
 1-0 Marco Ferrante (12 pen)
 Reggina-Milan 0-0
 Modena-Reggina 2-1
 1-0 Iacopo Balestri (61)
 2-0 Giuseppe Sculli (89)
 2-1 Gianluca Savoldi (90 + 4)
 Reggina-Empoli 1-0
 1-0 Shunsuke Nakamura (54 pen)
 Atalanta-Reggina 1-1
 1-0 Cristiano Doni (9)
 1-1 Emiliano Bonazzoli (52)
 Chievo-Reggina 2-1
 1-0 Federico Cossato (24)
 1-1 Federico Cossato (42 og)
 2-1 Nicola Legrottaglie (73)
 Reggina-Parma 0-0
 Reggina-Roma 1-3
 1-0 Emiliano Bonazzoli (15)
 1-1 Damiano Tommasi (61)
 1-2 Emerson (63)
 1-3 Jorge Vargas (68 og)
 2-3 Shunsuke Nakamura (90 + 2)
 Piacenza-Reggina 2-2
 0-1 David Di Michele (68)
 1-1 Dario Hübner (72)
 2-1 Dario Hübner (75)
 2-2 Mozart (77)
 Reggina-Juventus 2-1
 1-0 David Di Michele (17)
 1-1 Marcelo Zalayeta (23)
 2-1 Emiliano Bonazzoli (51)
 Bologna-Reggina 0-2
 0-1 Emiliano Bonazzoli (13)
 0-2 David Di Michele (68)

Relegation Playoffs

 Reggina-Atalanta 0-0
 Atalanta-Reggina 1-2
 1-0 Cesare Natali (18)
 1-1 Francesco Cozza (33)
 1-2 Emiliano Bonazzoli (85)

Reggina qualified for the 2003-04 Serie A.

Topscorers
  Emiliano Bonazzoli 7
  Shunsuke Nakamura 7
  David Di Michele 7
  Gianluca Savoldi 5
  Francesco Cozza 4

Sources
  RSSSF - Italy 2002/03

Reggina 1914 seasons
Reggina